John Paulsen can refer to:

 John Paulsen (swimmer) (1914-2011), American Olympic swimmer
 John Paulsen (volleyball) (born 1951), Canadian Olympic volleyball player
 J. J. Paulsen (born 1959), American sitcom writer
 John Dyrby Paulsen (born 1963), Danish politician

See also
 John Paulson (born 1955), American billionaire hedge fund manager